Mohammad Enver Baig (Urdu: محمد انور بیگ) is a Pakistani politician and former member of the Senate of Pakistan. He was affiliated politically with the Pakistan Peoples Party until 2012 before joining the Pakistan Muslim League (N). He served as chairperson of the Benazir Income Support Programme from 2013 to 2014.

Political career
Baig served as a member of the Senate of Pakistan on the Pakistan Peoples Party (PPP) ticket from 2003 to 2009. In 2012, he joined the Pakistan Muslim League (N) (PML-N) after PPP suspended his party membership due to alleged party discipline violation.

Baig was appointed chairman of the Benazir Income Support Programme (BISP) by President Mamnoon Hussain in November 2012 on the Prime Minister's advice. He resigned from this post a year later, in November 2014, and was appointed chairman of Pakistan Industrial Development Corporation (PIDC), a lesser position than BISP Chairman.

Achievements
Baig served as Honorary Council General of The Republic of Uruguay in Pakistan, and president of the Pakistan Overseas Employment Promoters Association from 1982 to 1983. He chaired the Standing Committee on Manpower and Overseas Pakistanis for the Federation of Pakistan Chamber of Commerce and Industry (FPCCI) from 1994 to 1995, and chaired the FPCCI's Standing Committee on Diplomatic Affairs from 1995 to 1998. Baig was also a member of the PPP's Policy Planning Wing.

Controversy
Baig asked the Public Accounts Committee of Pakistan (PAC) for audits of the Pakistan Cricket Board (PCB) in 2007; he termed the then PCB chairman Nasim Ashraf "the most incompetent official in the PCB". Ashraf, in reply, called Baig "a sick man." However, these statements were withdrawn in a meeting of the Senate Standing Committee on Sports held under the chairmanship of Tahir Hussain Mashhadi.

In February 2009, Baig accused the Pakistan national cricket team's players of being involved in match fixing, stating that "the main problem in the Pakistan team is gambling and match-fixing".

See also
 List of Senators of Pakistan
 List of committees of the Senate of Pakistan

References

Members of the Senate of Pakistan
Government of Benazir Bhutto staffers and personnel
Pakistani democracy activists
People from Sindh